Silvestro Benedetti (died 1537) was a Roman Catholic prelate who served as Bishop of Luni e Sarzana (1497–1537).

Biography
On 28 Apr 1497, Silvestro Benedetti was appointed during the papacy of Pope Alexander VI as Bishop of Luni e Sarzana. He served as Bishop of Luni e Sarzana until his death in 1537.

See also 
Catholic Church in Italy

References

External links and additional sources

 (for Chronology of Bishops) 
 (for Chronology of Bishops) 

15th-century Italian Roman Catholic bishops
16th-century Italian Roman Catholic bishops
Bishops appointed by Pope Alexander VI
1537 deaths